Mighty Med is an American Disney XD original series created by Jim Bernstein and Andy Schwartz and produced by It's a Laugh Productions for Disney XD. It stars Jake Short, Bradley Steven Perry, Paris Berelc, Devan Leos, and Augie Isaac. The series aired for two seasons, premiering on October 7, 2013, and running through September 9, 2015.

Main
Kaz (Bradley Steven Perry) is Oliver's best friend. He is lazy in school and, while devoted to Oliver, he will often try to get away with a shortcut that ends up getting both him and Oliver into trouble. While he seems stupid sometimes, he can unexpectedly come up with a smart solution to a problem. It was revealed by Jordan in "Alan's Reign of Terror" that he has 11 siblings. In "Mighty Mole", it's revealed that Kaz's full name is Kazimeras. At the end of "The Mother of All Villains", exposure to the Arcturion gave Kaz and Oliver superpowers.
Oliver (Jake Short) is Kaz's best friend and puts up with his flaws because he sees good in him. He is intelligent, sweet, and sarcastic, the perfect yin to Kaz's yang. He is also in love with Skylar. He apparently has a fear of elbows as shown in "Mighty Mole". In "Living the Dream", Oliver operated by Quimby Fletcher to have Ambrose write a story about his dream of the Arcturion. In "The Mother of All Villains", Oliver discovers that his mother Bridget is actually Mr. Terror. At the end of the episode, exposure to the Arcturion gave Oliver and Kaz superpowers.
Skylar Storm (Paris Berelc) is a superhero from the volcano planet Caldera and Oliver's love interest. Besides having peak human condition, some of Skylar's 24 superpowers include X-ray vision, explosive induction, time rewind, gyrokinesis, manipulation of celestial bodies, flight, super strength, intangibility, camouflage, invisibility, space survivability, and super speed. She recently lost her superpowers and her invisible motorcycle in a battle against her nemesis, Annihilator, and is now a normo patient at Mighty Med, where she is working to find a way to regain her superpowers. However, she still has amazing hand-to-hand combat skills, along with enhanced physical attributes, which can even become useful against super-powered beings. As a normo, she goes by the alias of Connecticut "Connie" Valentine when attending Logan High School. In the first-season finale, she regains her powers. However, she falls under Annihilator's control due to her tampering with them. While the Annihilator is at Mighty Max, Skylar is being used by the Annihilator to use a secret formula that turns superheroes into super villains. In "Storm's End", Skylar becomes evil enough to execute a powerful attack on the Annihilator and begin her own plans of conquering the galaxy. Using coal, Oliver tricks Skylar into thinking that he has given up as Hapax removes the corrupted powers from her. A weakened Annihilator shows up and uses Black Widower's poison power as Hapax transports Kaz, Oliver, and Skylar back to Mighty Med to get an antidote. Horace and the doctors work to keep Skylar from dying. After Skylar flatlines, Horace uses his abilities to revive her. In "Saving the people who save People" She uses the catchphrase "There's a storm coming...Skylar Storm" when fighting Megahertz in Mighty Med
Alan Diaz (Devan Leos) is the nephew of Horace. He slightly dislikes Kaz and Oliver because of their status as normos, so he does everything in his power to get rid of them. Although there are some occasions where he helps Kaz and Oliver. He seems to like Kaz a little more than Oliver, as shown in "How the Mighty Med Have Fallen" when they were trapped at Mighty Max. He is always seen wearing a sweater vest and it's suggested in "Lair, Lair" that he wears several sweater vests on top of each other. His power is telekinesis. In "Growing Pains", it is revealed that when Alan gets scared, he either turns into an animal or sprouts an animal body part. He also has the ability to turn other people into animals, as seen in "Mighty Mole". He apparently doesn't know the difference between a circle and a triangle and is bad with grammar due to his lack of education. In "The Mother of All Villains", Alan tries to find a good wedding gift for Bridget and Horace which leads to him unknowingly obtaining the Arcturion. During the wedding, he ends up learning that Optimo is his father. At the end of the episode, it is discovered that Alan's grandfather is Hapax the Elder.
Gus (Augie Isaac) (recurring season 1, starring season 2) is Kaz and Oliver's friend, but is unaware of their secret job. He is very quirky, sometimes unlikable, and lacks normal social skills. Over time, a crush on Jordan appears to have revealed itself. Gus' character started out as recurring, but became a series regular in the second season. Throughout the whole series, it has been mentioned that his family is rich, even capable of buying The Domain, as seen in "Are You Afraid the Shark?" He always keeps strange things in his backpack or wallet. In "Stop Bugging Me", it is revealed that Gus owns a cheetah. In "The Dirt on Kaz & Skylar", it is revealed that Gus owns a bobcat. In "The Mother of All Villains", Oliver enlisted Gus to help him crack the code on Mort's cell phone. Gus later buys a lot of wedding presents for Bridget and Horace.

Recurring
Jordan (Cozi Zuehlsdorff) is Kaz and Oliver's friend and hates Gus. She is very negative. Just like Kaz and Oliver, she loves video games and comics.
Stefanie (Brooke Sorenson) is the popular girl at Logan High School.

Mighty Med hospital staff
Horace Diaz (Carlos Lacámara) is the chief of staff of Mighty Med and is Alan's maternal uncle. He has the power of freezing people and is a bit eccentric. He apparently loves bridges. In "Atomic Blast from the Past", he is revealed to be 3,006 years old and has never aged since 1953. Some even consider that he is immortal. In "Storm's End", it is revealed that Horace is actually Caduceo and can only restore life five times with the side effect of having him gain weight in the hips. He appears in most of the episodes, despite only having a guest star role.
Benny (Karan Soni) is a worker at Mighty Med and a superhero named What's His Face. He has super speed, but it only works when he runs backwards. In addition, Benny has the ability to throw objects in slow motion. In "Saving The People Who Save People", it is shown that he dislikes Skylar.
Lizard Man (Dirk Ellis) is a humanoid lizard who stays at Mighty Med because he doesn't fit anywhere else. He is a frequently recurring character seen as an employee at Mighty Med.
Philip (Jeremy Howard) is an alien doctor with a large head, though it is very small compared to other inhabitants of his planet. He appears to dislike almost everyone at Mighty Med, even Horace. He frequently appears with very minor roles. In "Night of the Living Nightmare", it is revealed that his wildest dream is to have the Oscar Awards redesigned to look like him. In "The Claw Prank Redemption", it is revealed that Philip is the new security guard for Mighty Max. In "The Mother of All Villains", it is revealed that Philip is from the planet Baaaaahh and worked as a janitor at the time when his kind created the Arcturion. Following the incident where the spaceship crashed on Philadelphia, Philip was banished to Philadelphia. He also mentioned that his planet's president has the second smallest head. Philip also claimed that any mortal who touches the Arcturion would be vanquished.
The Newscaster (Angela Martinez) is the unnamed news anchor for a news channel exclusively for superheroes that is shown on the televisions at Mighty Med. She doesn't occur in most episodes.
Ambrose (Oliver Muirhead) is a member of Mighty Med's comic book department. He has the power to see visions of other heroes' lives, allowing him to write and illustrate incredibly fast. Ambrose agrees with Kaz and Oliver's idea to fudge some details to boost sales. He also does not seem to be paid well since he has to use a saw to sharpen his pencils. He was mentioned in "Storm's End", where Kaz had to change the expressions of his face from scared to not scared just in case Ambrose got a vision of the fight between Annihilator and Hapax. In "Living the Dream", Ambrose gets a new drawing table in the form of Lizard Man. When Oliver tells Ambrose about Kaz's dream of the Arcturion, Ambrose takes Oliver's suggestion to give Oliver the alias of Quimby Fletcher. He later helps Oliver into locating Kaz after he was abducted by Mr. Terror's minions.

Superheroes
Tecton (Jilon VanOver) is Kaz's favorite superhero who is a parody of Superman and Hyperion. He has superhuman strength and speed as well as flight, immunity to pain, and the ability to cause tectonic activity with a stomp of his foot. He is also capable of healing at a rapid rate, but if exposed to a gas that only exists when delta radiation mixes with gold, he will not be able to heal. In "So You Think You Can Be a Sidekick", Oliver was his sidekick until Alan took his place. In "Lair, Lair", Tecton and Skylar Storm are converted into supervillains by a formula made by the Annihilator that was used by Skylar.
Solar Flare (Carly Hollas) is a female superhero with pyrokinesis and pyrogenesis. Although the most recurring of the superheroes, Solar Flare has yet to have a speaking role. She is actually the second Solar Flare since there was a Solar Flare that was around back in the 1950s.
Incognito is an invisible superhero. Nobody knew what he looked like until the episode "Copy Kaz". His appearance is a white-faced human with silver clothing, ginger hair, and an eye-patch.
Blue Tornado (Brett Johnson) is a superhero with atmosphere manipulation, which allows him to spin at the speed of sound and shoot lightning from his hands. Kaz saw him in disguise and recognized him, which is what led him and Oliver to Mighty Med. In "Mighty Mole", Blue Tornado and Neocortex are converted into supervillains by a formula made by the Annihilator that was used by Skylar. He is a parody of the DC Comics superhero Red Tornado.
The Crusher (Jeffrey James Lippold) is the strongest man in the universe, capable of hurling someone across a room just by giving them a high-five. He was the first superhero to have his life saved by Kaz and Oliver, in which they shocked his feet to give him cardiac aid. According to Tecton, his real name is Glenn Crushman. Near the end of the first season, the Crusher gets married; however, his wife doesn't like him doing anything dangerous.
Brain Matter (Napoleon Ryan as a human, Troy Brenna as a monster) was once a hero with superhuman intelligence, which he used to create weapons, but he grew envious of superheroes with other powers. He created a serum that would give him more powers, but the experiment backfired and went horribly wrong—the serum turned him into a large, blue-skinned monster with super-strength, and his only thought was to eat brains. He was shrunken and locked in Mighty Med's freezer, but years later Kaz and Skylar released him, causing his monster form to go on a rampage, until it fell into a coffin with dry ice in it. He reappears in "Growing Pains" where he has been cured of the serum and given all the powers he intended to give himself, along with the ability to alter the age of any living thing. When doing so, that living thing's memories will remain intact and their clothes will alter their size to fit them. Occasionally, the object will continue aging/de-aging for a certain amount of time.
Titanio (Chris Elwood) was a test pilot turned aero space engineer who is also a billionaire. He became Titanio to battle the forces of evil. He has no powers, but he has a robotic suit with a stun ray, a jet pack, and strength boosters like Iron Man. He appeared in "I, Normo" where he had amnesia courtesy of the Black Falcon. With Alan's help, he regained his memory, but mistook Alan for the real Black Falcon and gave him amnesia. With his full suit on, he resembles Optimus Prime from Transformers. In "Guitar Superhero", Skylar enlists Titanio to pose as Soul Slayer to fight Remix while his robotic suit was being repaired. In "Free Wi-Fi", Titanio's robotic suit is possessed by Wi-Fi.
Mesmera (Tiphani Abney) is a female superhero who has an eye on the palm of her right hand that can hypnotize anyone. In "I, Normo", Alan used Mesmera in an attempt to restore Titanio's memory.
Citadel is a superhero with indestructible skin that can deflect magnetic fields. Citadel first appeared in "Sm'oliver's Travels", where he had stomach pains. Due to his indestructible skin, surgery could not be performed on him, so Oliver was shrunken and sent inside his body to remove the source of the pain. He reappears in "The Friend of My Friend Is My Enemy" where Oliver used an advanced stethoscope to hear his heartbeat.
The Great Defender (Dwight Howard) is from another planet, like Skylar. His suit is indestructible and his powers consist of ice ball projection, superhuman strength, and spinning things at high speed on his fingertips like a basketball. Despite being six feet and 11 inches, he is the shortest person on his planet. He appeared in "Pranks for Nothing", where Kaz played a prank on him by super-gluing a coin to the floor. He later tricked Kaz and Oliver into thinking he spun the Earth on his finger and pretended that his powers weren't working. He then had Solar Flare heat up the hospital to make them think the Earth was hurling towards the sun and had Horace make them think they had to sacrifice themselves to save the Earth. He was mentioned by Alan in "Alan's Reign of Terror" where Alan had him slow down the rotation of a planet so that his uncle's appointment there would be longer.
Captain Atomic (Bradley Dodds) was hit by a radioactive bullet in the 1950s, but survived thanks to the lucky yo-yo given to him by his girlfriend. Captain Atomic has the power of flight and can infuse atomic power into his yo-yo, allowing him to use it to snare his enemies, use it as a shield, and use it as a whip. He attempted to stop an intergalactic war in 1953, but a mishap trapped him in a wormhole for 61 years. In the present, the wormhole was opened by Oliver. After he was given a new battery to help him survive and defeating the Black Falcon, Captain Atomic decided to stick around in the present and experience its wonders. In "Fantasy League of Superheroes", it is revealed that Captain Atomic has super-strength and near invulnerability to the point where it can rival with Tecton's abilities.
Mr. Quick is a superhero with super speed. He first appeared in "Growing Pains", where he ran away from Alan when he wanted to talk to him.
Owl Girl (Erica Arrias) is an owl-themed female superhero who can fly and is good at hand-to-hand combat. She was first seen in "Growing Pains".
Timeline (Carlos Lacámara) is Horace's cousin, though they do not get along. He can see into the future, view holograms of his visions, and temporarily freeze time. He appeared in "It's Not the End of the World", where he came to Mighty Med because his powers were acting up. He helped Kaz ace his pop quiz, but because Kaz became smart, it was one of the requirements to open a portal where Crimson Demon's brothers Blue Demon, White Demon, and Matt Demon, were which almost ended the world. He speaks with an Italian accent. Due to him being played by the same actor as his cousin, they cannot appear on screen at the same time.
Gray Granite (Mike O'Hearn) is a rock-based superhero who was first seen in "Evil Gus". He was the only superhero who fought Gus and didn't lose his powers since he can dissolve into a pile of rocks. Gray Granite is a parody of Metamorpho while his rocky features are similar to Thing and Rockslide.
Neocortex (Mike Bradecich) is a telepathic superhero that can communicate mentally, alter one's personality, link minds, and put people into dreams and nightmares. Neocortex also has neuron-manipulation, which means he can send out psychic bursts that can immobilize a villain or control their behavior. He first appeared in "All That Kaz", where he broke his shoulder surfing the Internet. Oliver, wanting to be more popular, had Neocortex alter his personality to be more like Kaz's, but the real Kaz wanted to change it back. Unfortunately, Oliver redirected the blast back at Neocortex, causing him to become a nuclear reactor that almost blew him and the hospital up. Oliver cured Neocortex and Neocortex gave Oliver his original personality back. He reappears in "Night of the Living Nightmare", where he holds a grudge against Oliver for the events of his previous appearance. During that time, there was a lunar eclipse that caused him to only give people nightmares and if the victim dies in their nightmare, they'll die in reality. Luckily, the lunar eclipse ended before anyone died. In "Mighty Mole", Skylar uses the Annihilator's formula to turn him evil alongside Blue Tornado.
Surge is a superhero that can generate and control electricity. He was first seen in "Lockdown". In "How the Mighty Med Have Fallen", Surge is among the superheroes that fight the Annihilator and Skylar.
Absolute Zero is a superhero who can generate and control ice. He was first seen in "All That Kaz" working out with Snowstorm. In "There's a Storm Coming", it is revealed that Absolute Zero had a gun that freezes things in ice until it was stolen from him by the Annihilator.
Snowstorm is a female superhero with kryokinesis. At some point the Annihilator stole her powers and left her helpless. He took them and placed them on his trophy shelf with all the others. Later she was attacked by her nemesis and left in critical condition. She was taken to Mighty Med, but without her powers to save her, she would die. As such in "Lair, Lair", Kaz and Oliver went to get them back from the Annihilator's lair. At the end, her powers were restored and she happily created snow balls to celebrate. However, Skylar had secretly injected the Annihilator's secret formula into them meaning that she turned evil and became another of the Annihilator's servants.
Jade (Debby Ryan) was once an average, self-centered rock star who first appeared in "Guitar Superhero". During one of her concerts, Jade was covered with yak's milk lotion irradiated by sunlight. When she strummed her guitar with her tongue, the electric shock caused the lotion to give her flight, energy projection, and force field projection. With Kaz and Oliver's help, she learned what it meant to be a hero and became the superhero Remix. She was the first hero to have an on-screen origin, considering that was the main plot of her first appearance.
Spotlight (Ben Schreen) is a superhero that can shoot beams of light and can teleport. In "Guitar Superhero", Spotlight provided the light for Jade's costume unveiling for her Remix appearance. In "How the Mighty Med Have Fallen", Spotlight is among the superheroes that fight Annihilator and Skylar.
Alley Cat (Alina Andrei) is a cat-themed superhero. She is a parody of Catwoman. In "Night of the Living Nightmare", Alley Cat lost one of her nine lives in a nightmare and lost another one when a light fell from the ceiling. In "How the Mighty Med Have Fallen", Alley Cat is among the superheroes that help Titanio fight the Annihilator and Skylar.
Agent Blaylock (Windell D. Middlebrooks) is a member of the Secret Superhero Service Division. Besides wielding a laser gun, he can phase through the walls. Agent Blaylock first appeared in "Mighty Mad", where he posed as a teacher named Mr. Patterson in order to find the supervillain Dr. Wrath. After Dr. Wrath is defeated, Agent Blaylock sweeps up his remains and thanks Kaz, Oliver, and Skylar for their help. In "Mighty Mole", Agent Blaylock looks for a mole in Mighty Med when one is suspected of helping the Annihilator. When he finds that it is Skylar, Agent Blaylock is petrified by Skylar.
Optimo (Mike Beaver) is an undercover telekinetic superhero who is part of the Super Secret Heroes in Hiding. He is Alan's father and Horace's brother-in-law. Alan had never met him before. In "Free Wi-Fi", Alan disobeys Horace and goes to meet him. Optimo is forced to pretend to be a normo called Nelson in order to stay undercover. After Alan leaves, Horace is also shown to be covering up Optimo's secret. In "Do You Want to Build a Lava Man?" Optimo visits Horace for a medical procedure, causing Horace to keep Optimo from officially meeting Alan. Optimo's reason for having Horace watch Alan is to keep his archenemy, Razorclaw, from targeting Alan. The condition that Optimo has is a virus that would turn him into goo, and the only way to cure Optimo is to obtain a sample of Alan's DNA. When Horace manages to get a sample of Alan's DNA, he uses it to save Optimo before the final stage of the virus can turn him into goo. After being cured, Optimo is asked by Horace to obtain him a new paddle ball since the one he has is broken. In "The Mother of All Villains", Optimo in the form of Nelson attended the wedding of Horace and Bridget. When alone with Horace and Alan in the hotel suite, Nelson had to act out the missing years that he didn't have with Alan. Nelson admitted that the truth that he is Optimo and was in hiding in order to protect Alan from being targeted by Razorclaw. He was defeated by Bridget when he and Optimo try to stop her. At the end when Alan meets Hapax, it is revealed that Hapax is Alan's long-lost grandfather.
Dark Warrior (Ben Giroux) is a parody of Batman who uses a voice modulator to speak. Even though Dark Warrior appears tall, he has raised parts in his boots where his real height has him near the same size as Oliver. He wields a utility belt which contains various weapons and gadgets. Aside from being a parody of him, Dark Warrior appears to be based on many portrayals of Batman where his suit is similar to the Batsuit from Batman Begins, The Dark Knight, and The Dark Knight Rises. He has a dark, corrupt personality and he has a tendency to break that character.
Valkira is a valkyrie-themed superhero. She first appeared in "The Pen Is Mighty Med-ier than the Sword" where Horace was treating her injuries.
Gamma Girl is a gamma-powered superhero who can shoot gamma volts and have gamma manipulation. She first appeared in "The Pen Is Mighty Med-ier than the Sword".
Amicus (voiced by Matt Nolan) is a dog superhero.
Harold is Amicus' pet human.
Bubble Man is bubble-themed superhero who first appeared in "There's a Storm Coming", popping in and out of Skylar's party to eat chips. He is not liked by Alan.
Hapax (Devan Leos) is a mutant human who once taught the Annihilator how to use his powers. His powers include climate adaptions, age reversal, telekinesis, energy projection, life force absorption, and teleporting. In "Do You Want to Build a Lava Man?" Kaz and Oliver travel to Caldera in order to get Hapax to help free Skylar from the Annihilator's control. In "The Mother of All Villains", Hapax the Elder is summoned to Earth by Kaz and Skylar in an attempt to get the Arcturion energy out of Bridget. He tried to fight Bridget only to be thrown into a car. At the end of the episode, it is revealed that Hapax is Optimo's father and Alan's grandfather.
Dynamo is a superhero whose power canister was seen on the Annihilator's shelf. He was first mentioned in "There's a Storm Coming". Dynamo first appeared in "Future Tense" where he is among the superheroes that had a temporary hatred toward Skylar at the time when she was under the Annihilator's control.
Human Blade is a superhero with rotating fan blades for hands and has a weakness for electricity. In "Future Tense", Skylar hired Human Blade to make smoothies for the superheroes so that they would stop hating her for having been used as the Annihilator's servant. This didn't work because Alan used Surge to charge Human Blade, which resulted in Lizard Man's tail and Solar Flare II's pony tail getting chopped off.
Scarlet Ace is a superhero. She was first mentioned in "There's a Storm Coming", when her power canister was seen on the Annihilator's shelf in his lair. After this episode, she was not seen until "Mighty Mole". In "Future Tense", Scarlet Ace is among the superheroes who developed a temporary hatred towards Skylar due to her being used as the Annihilator's servant.
Disgusto is a smelly superhero. He first appeared in "Stop Bugging Me", where he had some alien bugs on him.
Queen Hornet (Bethany Levy) is a hornet-themed superhero. She came to Mighty Med in "Stop Bugging Me", where she was affected by the chemicals used by an exterminator.
Replicate is a shape-shifting superhero who appeared in "Stop Bugging Me".
Gravitas is a superhero. He was once injured by Ambush in "Less than Hero".
Lady Spectrum is a rainbow-themed superhero who was originally seen as Nurse Gladis. She first appeared in "Less than Hero", where she was impaled by Harpooner. After the program that auditions possible superheroes was terminated, Lady Spectrum did cheer up Skylar by making a rainbow for her.
Skipper is an ambulance driver who came to Mighty Med in "Less than Hero" in hopes of becoming a superhero. He was ultimately rejected when he failed to demonstrate his power of super speed. When he let Kaz drive the invisible ambulance, Kaz made him a superhero as an award. He was so happy, he super-skipped away. He showed up later using the alias of Skipper to save Kaz and Alan from Ambush, but was captured.
Arachnia is a spider-themed alien superhero who can weave strong webs. While Arachnia was in the hospital, Oliver had to safeguard her embryonic sac in and give birth to her children while evading Hunter Bounty.
Spark (Gianna LePera) is a teenage superhero whose mother got hit with gamma rays while orbiting around Mars, causing Spark to be born with superhuman physical attributes, flight, electrokinesis, and limited gravity manipulation. When Kaz tried to ask her out, she immediately wanted to go out with him. Due to her superpowers, Kaz became frightened and faked his own death. Because of this, Spark knew that Kaz wasn't the right type of person to go out with. During Spark's battle with her nemesis Nightstrike, Oliver comforted Spark and said that she should go out with someone who actually cared about her. After hearing this, she wanted to go out with Oliver and thought that he would be the type of guy to go out with.

Supervillains
The Annihilator (portrayed by Morgan Benoit, voiced by David Sobolov) is a fully armored supervillain who is the main archenemy of Skylar, Kaz and Oliver. He was once an original human named Neil Gundenhauser who developed superpowers and was tormented and teased for being a freak. He was trained by Hapax to be a superhero, which didn't go as Hapax planned. He keeps a trophy of the superpowers and weapons he steals from defeated superheroes. The Annihilator is responsible for stealing Skylar's powers and her invisible motorcycle in an ambush. In "The Friend of My Friend Is My Enemy", Annihilator was mentioned to have hired Experion to capture Skylar in order to keep her from regaining her powers. In "There's a Storm Coming", the Annihilator shows up in person, where he finds Kaz and Oliver in his lair trying to reclaim Skylar's powers. Using a steam cover, Kaz and Oliver managed to sneak out of through the ventilation with Skyler's powers. The Annihilator later catches up to Kaz and Oliver at Mighty Med due to the tracking device he places on his trophies. Skylar then fights the Annihilator. When Mighty Med's reactor goes supernova, Skylar takes advantage of this by tricking the Annihilator into a trap. In a twist ending, the Annihilator had tampered with Skylar's powers in order to control her and Mighty Med. In "How the Mighty Med Have Fallen", the Annihilator plans to obtain the quantum chip that contains the secret files of every superhero. It turned out that the quantum chip is in the form of a sour cream and onion potato chip that Kaz and Oliver ate, which the Annihilator and Skylar plan to get it out of their stomachs. When the Annihilator plans to cut Kaz and Oliver open in order to get the quantum chip, he and Skylar are tricked into using the forestation on them for Horace. Titanio arrives with a cadre of superheroes to fight the Annihilator. After Megahertz charges a capsule that turns back time, time is changed back by Skylar. The Annihilator plans to use Skylar to help him create an army of supervillains from the superheroes so that he and Skylar can rule the world. In "Mighty Mole", he and Skylar turn Neocortex evil. In "Do You Want to Build a Lava Man?" Kaz and Oliver discover the Annihilator's origin and make plans to go to Caldera in order to get Hapax to help free Skylar from the Annihilator's control. After Kaz and Oliver pass Hapax's challenge, the Annihilator and Skylar arrive on Caldera. In "Storm's End", the Annihilator faces off against Hapax until Skylar manages to execute a powerful attack on the Annihilator upon becoming more evil than him. When the wounded Annihilator catches up to Skylar and uses Black Widower's poison power, he is taken down by Hapax. After the Annihilator dissolves, those who are under his control become good again.
Wallace and Clyde (Randy Sklar and Jason Sklar) are owners of The Domain and want to destroy the superheroes at Mighty Med and get revenge on Horace. In "Copy Kaz", it is revealed that Wallace and Clyde were once a being called Catastrophe (Derek Mears), the most powerful villain in the galaxy. Catastrophe was eventually defeated by Horace and divided into two pathetic humans with little power. When apart or together, Wallace and Clyde can disintegrate anything. In "There's a Storm Coming", Wallace and Clyde trick Alan out of the other half of the Dyad of Nebulon that Horace holds. Upon forcing the location of Mighty Med out of Alan and leaving him bound and gagged, Wallace and Clyde rejoin Horace's piece of the dyad with theirs at Mighty Med's entrance and joined together as Catastrophe to seek revenge on Horace. When he finds Horace, Catastrophe gets out of Horace's freeze trap and destroys the weapon that Horace would use in the event of Catastrophe's attack. Due to the reactor going nova, Catastrophe's powers were disabled as Alan breaks the dyad in half, regressing Catastrophe back to Wallace and Clyde. When Wallace and Clyde try to persuade Alan use the dyad's powers to become more powerful than he ever wanted to be and to give Wallace and Clyde a continent to rule over, as long as it's not Australia, Alan throws the Dyad of Nebulon pieces into the reactor, stating that it's too much work. Afterward, Wallace and Clyde are arrested by the Mighty Med security team, along with Megahertz and Experion. In "The Claw Prank Redemption", it is revealed that Wallace and Clyde could never get seats at the cool villains table at Mighty Max. In "Wallace and Clyde: A Grand Day Out", Dr. Diaz puts Oliver in charge of reforming Wallace and Clyde, which successfully happens at the end.
Megahertz (James Ryen) is a human/titanium cyborg forged in a freak accident at a power plant and Tecton's nemesis. Like his name suggests, Megahertz has high voltage electrokinesis. Unfortunately, if he uses it too much, he has to go back to the power plant where he became Megahertz and recharge. According to Kaz and Oliver, his real name is Leslie. He ultimately despises not just Tecton, but also Kaz and Oliver. In "There's a Storm Coming", Megahertz is a cellmate of Experion where was previously in solitary confinement for injuring a prison guard's pelvis. Experion uses the cell phone he took from Kaz to free himself and Megahertz from Mighty Max. During the fight at Mighty Med, the reactor goes supernova, disabling Megahertz's powers as he, Experion, Wallace, and Clyde are arrested by the Mighty Med security team. In "How the Mighty Med Have Fallen", Megahertz was placed in the Chamber of Certain Destruction, a cell for repeated offenders that turns them into limited edition action figures. Kaz, Oliver, and Alan fall into it and encounter Megahertz, where he explains the chamber's purpose. Kaz, Oliver, and Megahertz are let out when Alan accidentally turns into a blue whale. Kaz and Oliver convince Megahertz to boost the signal to Oliver's phone so that they can contact some help. Before leaving, Megahertz warns Kaz, Oliver, and Alan not to tell anyone that he helped them or else he'll hunt them down. Megahertz later arrives when Skylar uses her powers to turn back time. In "The Dirt on Kaz & Skylar", Megahertz is working as a janitor as part of his prison sentence. Megahertz offers to help Oliver deal with Mr. Terror if he can reduce his prison sentence. Megahertz comes up with a plan to hold a book-signing run by Quimby Fletcher. When Mort shows up to attack Oliver, he ends up fighting Megahertz. Afterward, Oliver and Megahertz arrive at school, where Megahertz starts to fall under the influence of the Arcturion. After a brief struggle with Kaz, Oliver, and Skylar, Megahertz is knocked out by Gus using a bobcat. Megahertz is taken back to Mighty Max. He is a spoof of Metallo and Electro. His name is a play on "megahertz," meaning a high unit of electrical frequency.
Micros (Adam Leadbeater) is a supervillain who can make himself microscopic. He is the archenemy of Citadel, where he stated that Citadel stole his girlfriend in college. When he was inside Citadel, he used a laser gun and utility saw to try to destroy the superhero from inside. He used both of these to try to kill Oliver as well.
Crimson Demon (Douglas Tait) is a demonic supervillain who had excellent jumping abilities and wields a fire staff that shoots fireballs. His brothers, Blue Demon, White Demon, and Matt Demon, were imprisoned in a lower dimension by Tecton where Crimson Demon plotted to free them. He came to Logan High School to watch the events unfold that would open the portal and free his brothers. However, just as the portal was opening, Oliver figured out a way to manipulate Timeline's powers to freeze time, giving them a bit more time. Immune to this, Crimson Demon attacked. Thanks to Timeline predicting his attacks and Skylar's moves, they managed to fight back and imprison him. Skylar kicked him into a drum Kaz and Oliver were holding, and then the two threw the demon into the same portal, thus imprisoning him with his brothers. Crimson Demon is a parody of Dormammu and Red Skull.
Experion (Chase Austin) is a former superhero and Skylar's former childhood friend from the planet Caldera. He appeared in the episode "The Friend of My Friend Is My Enemy", supposedly attempting to restore Skylar's powers, but in truth, he had actually turned to the dark side and was attempting to bring her to the Annihilator. His powers are magnetism and gravokinesis. Until discovering his true nature, Kaz thought Experion was the second coolest teen. When he and Skylar had a fight, he then not only despised Skylar, but also Kaz and Oliver. Experion is now an enemy to Kaz, Oliver, and Skylar after being taken away by Mighty Med's security team. In "There's a Storm Coming", Kaz and Oliver visit Experion at Mighty Max in order to get the location of the Annihilator's lair. He tells them that he resides in a sewer lair four blocks from the abandoned slaughterhouse. He lends them his right eyeball, which regrows, in order to get through the retina scanners at the Annihilator's base. During this time, Experion is shown to be a cellmate of Megahertz. Experion uses the cell phone he took from Kaz to free himself and Megahertz from Mighty Max. During the fight at Mighty Med, the reactor goes supernova, disabling Experion's powers as he, Megahertz, Wallace, and Clyde are arrested by the Mighty Med security team.
Black Falcon (Scott Anthony Leet) is one of the most dangerous villains in the show. Black Falcon can fly and shoot deadly energy blasts that can either harm or stun the victims. He has a staff that can enhance his powers, which serves as his main weapon of choice. His danger factor is due to the fact that he knocked out almost every superhero in his area and some of his energy blasts can even shatter Captain Atomic's yo-yo shield. In "How the Mighty Med Have Fallen", it was revealed that Black Falcon was turned into a limited action figure by Mighty Max's Chamber of Certain Destruction alongside Blood Chef and Machete Man. He has a slight English accent and is similar to Thor from Marvel Comics.
Dr. Wrath is a shape-shifting supervillain that feeds off negative energy. No one knew what Dr. Wrath really looked like due to them always wearing a cloak and being a shape-shifter. They arrived at Logan High School where they shape-shifted into Stefanie and impersonated her, spreading negative energy to strengthen them while building a machine that would make the whole world negative. Kaz and Skylar end up getting captured, but manage to break free, and Skylar confronts and fights Dr. Wrath, while Kaz alters the machine. However, Dr. Wrath proves too powerful for Skylar and the machine activates. However, due to Kaz's alterations, instead of creating negativity, it created positive elements, thus returning Dr. Wrath to his true form before exploding and being reduced to a pile of ashes. His ashes are then swept up by Agent Blaylock. In "New Kids are the Docs", Chaz and Gulliver plotted to trick Dr. Diaz into restoring Dr. Wrath.
Sonic Shriek (Marcus Giamatti) was originally an inventor who tried to make limitless energy out of sound, but one of his inventions malfunctioned and he gained super powers. After that, he vowed to destroy any monument named after an inventor, regardless of how many lives were destroyed in the process. At some point, he decided to destroy the Franklin bridge as seen in "Fantasy League of Superheroes". As all the superheroes were caught up in Kaz's fantasy hero league, they were all out trying to stop the same disaster. As such, Kaz and Skylar were forced to try and stop him themselves. Unfortunately, Sonic Shriek manages to easily defeat Skylar and imprisons her and Kaz. Tecton arrives to stop him, but is interrupted when Captain Atomic also arrives. As both heroes were still too caught up in Kaz's fantasy league to think straight, they began fighting each other, allowing Sonic Shriek to capture them both. He then started the bomb's count down. Skylar manages to goad him into trying to destroy them. At the last minute, she dodges and the blast destroys the restraints, freeing her and Kaz. She manages to knock down Sonic Shriek and free Tecton and Captain Atomic. Captain Atomic then flies the bomb to a safe distance while Tecton easily defeats Sonic Shriek, before taking him away.
Revengeance is a supervillain. A battle with Tecton left Revengeance as a disembodied cloud. Revengeance plans on regaining his physical form and conquering the world. He has flight and mind control where he can possess the body of anyone. He attempted to succeed in his plan, but was sucked into a vacuum cleaner.
Disembowler is a re-retired supervillain with knives for fingers who first appeared in "Lockdown" where he is part of Wallace's intervention to get Clyde to give up his evil ways.
Soul Slayer (Scott Connors) is Titanio's nemesis. Soul Slayer has energy projection and teleportation. Skylar had Titanio dress up as Soul Slayer, but the real Soul Slayer arrived because he tracked Titanio that location and wanted to destroy him. Remix and Skylar battled him, but Soul Slayer's teleportation gave him the upper hand. However, Kaz and Oliver turned the tide by playing electric guitars, forming magnetic fields that left Soul Slayer unable to teleport, eventually leading to his defeat.
Wi-Fi (John Griffin) is a supervillain who wants to steal all of Mighty Med's secrets and share them with the rest of the supervillains except for Counterfeit. He has the power to go into computers, which is how he attempts to steal Mighty Med's secrets. He appeared in "Free Wi-Fi", when Kaz accidentally frees him from his flash drive prison.
Dreadlock (Bruno Gunn) is Dark Warrior's nemesis. Dreadlock designs weapons that counteract his nemesis' weapons. He was never seen in person, but it should be known that he is extremely evil, threatening to fire his henchman out of a cannon and into a saw if he fails. He was only seen on a monitor. After it was discovered that Oliver and Bob were posing as the respectful characters, Kaz and Oliver told Ambrose to end the comic with Dark Warrior and Dreadlock falling into the dark parts of the city. His mask bears slight resemblance to that of Bane from The Dark Knight Rises.
Bob (Elisha Yaffe) is Dreadlock's henchman. He had to battle Oliver in Dreadlock's place at the time when Dreadlock had a stomach virus.
The Ambusher (Mustafa Shakir) is a supervillain who has super strength and is an expert chemist. In "Less than Hero", he injured Gravitas and had come up with a chemical to destroy all plant life in the Amazon Rainforest.
Hunter Bounty (Brett Wagner) is a notorious bounty hunter that is known throughout seven galaxies. He appeared in "Oliver Hatches the Egg" where he targeted the egg sack of Arachnia that Oliver was watching over. Thanks to the egg sack, Oliver was able to defeat Hunter Bounty and get the egg sack back to Arachnia.
Nightstrike (Morgan Benoit) is the nemesis of Spark. He is capable of teleporting, escrima, and summoning weapons. He appeared shortly after Kaz dumped Spark. He attempted to kill Spark only for Kaz to apologize to Spark, restoring her confidence and allowing her to defeat Nightstrike. In "The Mother of All Villains", Nightstrike is among the supervillains that target the Arcturion. Upon crashing the wedding of Horace Diaz and Bridget, Nightstrike and the villains were taken down by the superheroes present and remanded to Mighty Max. He appears to be a villainous parody of Nightwing.
Slaughter Master (David Mattey) is a supervillain with super-strength and flight as well as his skill at wielding the Hammer of Achelon. He appeared in "The Key to Being a Hero" where he wanted to destroy the Key Keeper's key. He was defeated by Kaz, Oliver, and Skylar. In "The Mother of All Villains", Slaughter Master is among the supervillains that target the Arcturion. Upon crashing the wedding of Horace Diaz and Bridget, Slaughter Master and the villains were taken down by the superheroes present and remanded to Mighty Max.
Mr. Terror (portrayed by Jamie Denbo, voiced by Richard Epcar) is a mysterious crime lord and evil genius who wears a black mask over his entire face. Mr. Terror's true identity is Oliver's overbearing mother Bridget while using a voice modulator to disguise her voice. Her plan is to obtain the Arcturion so she can become the most powerful villain in existence. Bridget had previously worked for a boss was the main identity of Argento. In order to keep her son safe, Bridget eliminated Argento and took over his criminal empire. Outside of her identity, Bridget plans to marry Horace Diaz. In "Thanks for the Memory Drives", Kaz, Oliver, and Skylar learn about Mr. Terror's goals. After his henchmen have failed, Mr. Terror spared them due to a phone call from Oliver. In "The Mother of All Villains", Bridget makes her final plans for her wedding to Horace at a local hotel. While Horace and Alan are busy, she sends a call to Mort to find the Arcturion. Bridget then goes around collecting the phones so that they can't disrupt the wedding. Due to Bridget mentioning a call from her employer Mort, Kaz, Oliver, and Skylar secretly figure out that Bridget is actually Mr. Terror. When the wedding starts, it ends up being interrupted by Alan's father Nelson. Upon being confronted by Oliver, Bridget came clean and stated that she wanted to rule the world just to protect Oliver. Before Bridget can claim the item, different super villains showed up which resulted in a fight between the super villains and the attending superheroes. After the fight, Bridget claims the Arcturion with Mort's help. Kaz, Oliver, and Bridget grab the orb part of the Arcturion where Bridget gets knocked out from its power leaving her in critical condition. After Oliver leaves, Bridget's body is found by Horace, Alan, and Nelson. Horace had no choice but to use the last of his powers on Bridget. When Bridget regains consciousness, Horace learns that Bridget was Mr. Terror where she is now the most powerful being on the planet. Bridget then begins to go on a rampage. Optimo makes his attempt to stop Bridget only to be thrown into a building. Hapax the Elder makes his attempt only for Bridget to throw him into a car. Bridget then leaves to take over the world. In "Lab Rats: Elite Force", it was revealed in the first episode by Oliver that he, Kaz and Skylar captured Bridget and she would spend the rest of her life in prison.
Mort (portrayed by John J. Joseph) is a minion of Mr. Terror that has reptilian abilities. In "The Mother of All Villains", Mort helps Bridget claim the Arcturion. He was surprised that Bridget's son was Quimby Fletcher all along.

References

 The episodes of Mighty Med that have aired are the source of most of the information in this article.

Mighty Med
Mighty Med